Chester Arthur Crist (February 10, 1882 – January 7, 1957), nicknamed "Squak", was a Major League Baseball catcher. He was named for Chester A. Arthur, who was President of the United States at the time of Crist's birth.

External links

1882 births
1957 deaths
Major League Baseball catchers
Philadelphia Phillies players
Providence Grays (minor league) players
Edmonton Grays players
Trenton Tigers players
Jersey City Skeeters players
Topeka Jayhawks players
Baseball players from Ohio
People from Cozaddale, Ohio